|}

This is a list of electoral district results of the 1953 Western Australian election.

Results by Electoral district

Albany

Avon Valley

Blackwood

Boulder

Bunbury

Canning

Claremont

Collie

Cottesloe

Dale

Darling Range 

 Two party preferred vote was estimated.

East Perth

Eyre

Fremantle

Gascoyne 

 Preferences were not distributed.
 Gascoyne had been won by the Independent Liberal candidate in the 1951 by-election.

Geraldton 

 Two party preferred vote was estimated.

Greenough

Guildford-Midland

Hannans

Harvey

Kalgoorlie

Katanning

Kimberley

Leederville

Maylands

Melville 

 Preferences were not distributed.

Merredin-Yilgarn

Middle Swan

Moore

Mount Hawthorn

Mount Lawley

Mount Marshall

Murchison 

 Two party preferred vote was estimated.

Murray

Narrogin

Nedlands

North Perth

Northam

Pilbara

Roe

South Fremantle

South Perth

Stirling

Subiaco

Toodyay

Vasse

Victoria Park

Warren

Wembley Beaches

West Perth

See also 

 1953 Western Australian state election
 Members of the Western Australian Legislative Assembly, 1953–1956
 Candidates of the 1953 Western Australian state election

References 

Results of Western Australian elections
1953 elections in Australia